Plaukiai (formerly) is a village in Kėdainiai district municipality, in Kaunas County, in central Lithuania. According to the 2011 census, the village had a population of 4 people. An ancient cemetery place is located in the village (culture heritage object).

Demography

References

Villages in Kaunas County
Kėdainiai District Municipality